Cailloux, Cailleux, or Caillaux is a French surname. Notable people with the surname include:

Alphonse de Cailleux (1788–1876), French painter and director of the Musée du Louvre
André Cailleux (1907–1986), French paleontologist and geologist
Andre Cailloux (1825–1863), U.S. soldier
Edmond Caillaux (1896–1943), French World War I flying ace
Joseph Caillaux (1863–1944), French politician and prime minister from 1911 to 1912
Henriette Caillaux (1874–1943), French socialite and wife of Joseph Caillaux
Théophile Cailleux (fl. 1879), Belgian lawyer and author

See also
Cailleux (crater), a lunar crater
Marchand de cailloux, an album by the French artist Renaud
Cailloux-sur-Fontaines, a town in central-eastern France
Caillou (disambiguation)

French-language surnames

fr:Cailloux